Rackith is a village and a former municipality in Wittenberg district in Saxony-Anhalt, Germany. Since 1 January 2010, it is part of the town Kemberg.

Geography 
Rackith lies about 12 km southeast of Lutherstadt Wittenberg.

Subdivisions
Rackith has two of these: Lammsdorf and Bietegast.

History 
Rackith had its first documentary mention in 1004.

Economy and transportation
Federal Highway (Bundesstraße) B 182 between Wittenberg and Torgau runs right through the community. Rackith railway station lies on the single-track line between Wittenberg and Bad Schmiedeberg.

References

External links 
Verwaltungsgemeinschaft's website

Former municipalities in Saxony-Anhalt
Kemberg